Sauvignon may refer to:
Sauvignon blanc – a white wine grape
Sauvignon vert – a white wine grape widely planted in Chile. Also a name in California for Muscadelle
Sauvignon gris – a pink wine grape
Cabernet Sauvignon – a red wine grape